The men's middleweight event was part of the weightlifting programme at the 1924 Summer Olympics. The weight class was the third-lightest contested, and allowed weightlifters of up to 75 kilograms (165 pounds). The competition was held on Wednesday, 23 July 1924.

Results

One hand snatch

One hand clean & jerk

Press

Two hand snatch

Two hand clean & jerk

Final standing after the last event:

References

Sources
 official report
 

Middleweight